Lila, Lila is a 2009 German film starring Daniel Brühl and Hannah Herzsprung.

At various film festivals and international screenings the film was sometimes known under the title My Words, My Lies, My Love or My Words, My Lies – My Love.

The American distributor is Corinth Releasing.

Plot 
The film starts with Daniel Brühl as a waiter named David Kern, in a desperate move to impress Marie, played by Hannah Herzsprung, passes off a manuscript he found as his own. However, trouble comes when the real author comes after him.
The film is based on a same title novel by the Swiss author Martin Suter.

Cast 

 Daniel Brühl as David Kern
 Hannah Herzsprung as Marie
 Henry Hübchen as Jacky Stocker
  as Karin Kohler

See also 
The Words (film), a 2012 American film with a similar plot

References

External links

http://www.tcm.com/tcmdb/title/775221/Lila-Lila/

2009 films
German romantic comedy-drama films
2000s German-language films
Films scored by Max Richter
Films about writers
Films based on Swiss novels
2000s German films
2009 romantic comedy-drama films